Common names: Mexican horned pitvipers.

Ophryacus is a genus of venomous pit vipers endemic to Mexico. The name is derived from the Greek word ophrys, which means "brow", and the Latin word acus, which means "needle", an allusion to the characteristic horn-like scales over the eyes. Currently, three species are recognized and no subspecies.

Description
They are characterized by the presence of a single scale over the eye that takes the shape of either a long and relatively slender spine, or a flattened horn. Often, other supraocular scales are also shaped in such a way that they project slightly.

Geographic range
They are restricted to the mountains of eastern, central and southern Mexico.

Species

T) Type species.

References

Further reading

 Cope, E.D. 1887. Catalogue of Batrachians and Reptiles [Batrachia and Reptilia] of Central America and Mexico. Bull. U.S. Nat. Mus. 32: 1-98. ("Ophryacus Cope, gen. nov.", p. 88.)
 O'Shea, M. 2005. Venomous Snakes of the World. Princeton University Press. .

External links
 

Crotalinae
Endemic reptiles of Mexico
Snake genera
Taxa named by Edward Drinker Cope